Eitan Berglas (28 June 1934 – August 8, 1992) was an Israeli economist and banker. He was chairman of Bank Hapoalim from 1985 to 1992.

Born in Tel Aviv, Berglas attended the Hebrew University of Jerusalem and then earned a master's and doctorate in economics from the University of Chicago.

Berglas helped found the economics department at Tel Aviv University in 1966. In 1992, shortly after Berglas' death, the university decided to expand the department into a business school, which was named in Berglas' honor.

References 

1934 births
1992 deaths
University of Chicago alumni
People from Tel Aviv
Hebrew University of Jerusalem Faculty of Social Sciences alumni
Tel Aviv University people
20th-century  Israeli economists